Marcy Toepel is an American politician and member of the Republican Party. She represented the 147th District in the Pennsylvania House of Representatives from 2010 until 2020.

Toepel was elected to the seat in 2010, when she handily won a special election triggered by the resignation of Republican Bob Mensch. Mensch had won another special election held for the State Senate seat vacated by Republican Rob Wonderling, who had resigned to take-over as President and CEO of Greater Philadelphia Chamber of Commerce.

In December 2019, Toepel announced that she would not seek re-election. She was replaced by Tracy Pennycuick.

References

External links
State Representative Marcy Toepel official caucus website
Marcy Toepel (R) official PA House website

Republican Party members of the Pennsylvania House of Representatives
Women state legislators in Pennsylvania
Living people
People from Pennsburg, Pennsylvania
21st-century American politicians
21st-century American women politicians
1958 births